Paul Dillon is an American character actor who began his career in show business in Chicago. His film career began in 1994 with the film Blink in which he played the role of Neal Booker. He played Paddy O'Brien in Austin Powers: International Man of Mystery, the most successful film in which he has a credited role.

Dillon also has appeared on many hit TV series including NYPD Blue, CSI: Miami, The Guardian, and his recurring role as Angelo in The Pretender.  Most recently, he had a guest appearance as Ezekiel in the new ABC drama Night Stalker. Currently, he plays Gary in the play Rantoul and Die.

He is also the founder and artistic director of the Bang Bang Spontaneous Theatre group.

Filmography
On the Road (2012) as Montana Slim
The Butcher (2009) as Doyle
Stellina Blue (2009) as Paul
The Shield
 episode "Moving Day" (2008) as Chaffee
 episode "Parricide" (2008) as Chaffee
 episode "Bitches Brew" (2008) as Chaffee
The Blue Hour (2007) as Sal
One Night with You (2006) as Will
The Run (2006/I) as Wells
Just (2006) as Lou Tanner
The Closer episode "Blue Blood" (2006) as Captain Leahy
Sixth Street Bridge (2006) as Driver
Night Stalker episode "Malum" (2005) as Ezekiel Seaver
CSI: Crime Scene Investigation episode "Room Service" (2005) as Joe Cavanaugh
Strong Medicine episode "First Response" (2005) as Frank the Truck Driver
CSI: Miami episode "Pirated" (2004) as Owen Harrell
The Guardian episode "My Aim Is True" (2003) as Probation Officer, Paul Tibbits
P.S. Your Cat Is Dead! (2002) as Pidgeon 
The Pretender: Island of the Haunted (2001) as Angelo
Pasadena (pilot episode) (2001) as Philip Parker
The Pretender 2001 (2001) as Angelo
Held for Ransom (2000) as John
The Pretender (1996-2000) as Angelo
Fight Club (1999) (uncredited) as Irvin
Law & Order episode "Admissions" (1999) as Eddie Clayman
Soldier (1998) as Slade
Chicago Cab (1998) as Cab Driver 
Austin Powers: International Man of Mystery (1997) as Paddy O'Brien
Platform Six (1997) as The Candlemaker 
Millennium (pilot episode) (1996) as The Frenchman
Cutthroat Island (1995) as Snelgrave
Fair Game (1995) as Leonid Volkov (The Hacker)
Natural Born Killers (1994) (uncredited) as Prison Inmate Who Breaks TV 
Dead at 21 episode "Life During Wartime" (1994) as Roderick
Under the Influence (1994) as Villain
Blink (1994) as Neal Booker
Missing Persons (pilot episode) (1993) as Cecil McIntire

External links

American male film actors
American male television actors
Living people
Year of birth missing (living people)